Tomaso Barisini, better known as Tommaso da Modena and sometimes called Tomaso Baffini (1326 – 1379) was an Italian painter of the mid-14th century.

Biography

Tommaso trained in Venice and worked mostly in Northern Italy, but also worked for the court of the Emperor Charles IV in Prague.

In Karlstein Castle, two pictures on wood are attributed to him, an Ecce Homo and a Madonna. A St Catherine is in the Gallerie dell'Accademia in Venice.

Perhaps Tommaso's most important work was done in Treviso.

In 1352 as an expression of the Dominican intellectual vocation Tommaso was commissioned to paint a fresco cycle of 40 Dominicans scholars at their desks including Popes, Cardinals, theologians, and philosophers. The work is in the chapter room of the former Dominican convent of San Nicolo' at Treviso, now a seminary. Among others, the cycle portrays Cardinal Annibale Annibaldi, Doctor of the Church Thomas Aquinas, Cardinal Hugh Aycelin, and Cardinal Latino Malabranca Orsini, all of whom were professors of the Dominican studium at Santa Sabina the forerunner of the Pontifical University of Saint Thomas Aquinas, Angelicum, as well as Bishop and Doctor of the Church Albert the Great founder of the Dominican studium at Cologne, and renowned  biblical commentator Cardinal Hugh of Saint-Cher.  The portrait of Saint-Cher is the earliest known depiction of a person wearing spectacles.

References

Sources
 

14th-century Italian painters
Italian male painters
Painters from Venice
Painters from Modena
Year of death missing
Year of birth missing